The Storm RG Fury is an Italian microlight aircraft, designed and produced by Storm Aircraft of Sabaudia. Storm Aircraft was originally called SG Aviation srl. The aircraft is supplied complete and ready-to-fly.

The aircraft was originally marketed as the Storm RG.

Design and development
Developed from the fixed gear Storm Century and designed for the Fédération Aéronautique Internationale European microlight class, the Storm Fury RG features a cantilever low-wing, a two-seats-in-side-by-side configuration enclosed cockpit under a forward-hinged bubble canopy, retractable tricycle landing gear and a single engine in tractor configuration.

The aircraft is made from aluminum sheet with some fibreglass parts. Improvements over the Storm Century include fewer panel joins, a newly redesigned vertical fin and drag-reduction. The standard engines used are the  Rotax 912ULS and the  Rotax 914 turbocharged powerplant.

Specifications (Fury RG)

References

External links

RG Fury
2000s Italian sport aircraft
2000s Italian ultralight aircraft
2000s Italian civil utility aircraft
Single-engined tractor aircraft
Low-wing aircraft
Homebuilt aircraft